White-eyed grass is a common name for at least two species of plants:

 Sisyrinchium albidum, a species of flowering plant in the family Iridaceae
 Sisyrinchium campestre, a small herbaceous perennial plant in the iris family